Little Thirteen is a 2012 German drama film directed by Christian Klandt. The film stars Muriel Wimmer as one of three troubled teenagers from different social backgrounds that face various challenges.

Synopsis
Thirteen-year-old Sarah (Muriel Wimmer) is no stranger to sex and one-night stands, nor is her sixteen-year-old best friend Charly (Antonia Putiloff). It's only when Sarah meets the older Lukas (Joseph Konrad Bundschuh) online that she begins to desire something beyond casual hookups — but is that what Lukas wants? At the same time Charly has to figure out what she is to do about her pregnancy and her desire to find a father for the unborn child.

Cast
Muriel Wimmer as Sarah
Antonia Putiloff as Charly
Joseph Konrad Bundschuh as Lukas (as Joseph Bundschuh)
Isabell Gerschke as Doreen
Philipp Kubitza as Diggnsäck
Gerdy Zint as Maik
Gisa Flake as Yvonne
Chiron Elias Krase as Robert
Pelagia Kapoglou as Nele
Claudia Geisler as Silke, Lukas' Mutter
Thomas Bading as Martin, Lukas' Vater

Production
To accompany the underage actresses Muriel Wimmer and Antonia Putiloff during the shooting of their nude and sex scenes, the director Christian Klandt and his film team were supported by two sex education specialists from 'pro familia Berlin'.

Reception
Berliner Zeitung panned the film, calling it a "barren, tensionless film" and saying that it was "as ambitious as it is hollow". In contrast, n-tv gave a more favorable review.

Awards
German Cinema New Talent Award - Best Performance for actress Antonia Putiloff at the Filmfest München (2012, won)

References

External links

2010s coming-of-age drama films
2010s teen drama films
2012 films
Films shot in Berlin
German coming-of-age drama films
German teen drama films
2010s German-language films
Juvenile sexuality in films
2012 drama films
2010s German films